Diego Douglas Balbinot (born 7 January 1984) is a retired Brazilian footballer with Italian Passport. He played as a defender.

Honours

Club
JK Nõmme Kalju
 Estonian Cup: Runners Up: 2008–09
 3 de Febrero
 División Intermedia: Champion: 2013

References

External links

planotatico.com
folha.uol.com.br
Diego Balbinot at HKFA

1984 births
Living people
Brazilian footballers
Italian footballers
Association football defenders
Esporte Clube Juventude players
Brazilian expatriate footballers
Club Atlético 3 de Febrero players
Expatriate footballers in Hong Kong
Shek Kip Mei SA players
Brazilian expatriate sportspeople in Hong Kong
Expatriate footballers in Spain
Brazilian expatriate sportspeople in Spain
Expatriate footballers in Estonia
Nõmme Kalju FC players
Brazilian expatriate sportspeople in Estonia
Expatriate footballers in Hungary
Nyíregyháza Spartacus FC players
Brazilian expatriate sportspeople in Hungary
Expatriate footballers in Paraguay
Brazilian expatriate sportspeople in Paraguay
Meistriliiga players